The 1908 Wisconsin gubernatorial election was held on November 3, 1908.

Incumbent Republican Governor James O. Davidson won re-election, defeating Democratic nominee John A. Aylward and Socialist nominee Harvey Dee Brown, with 54.03% of the vote.

Primary elections
Primary elections were held on September 1, 1908.

Democratic primary

Candidates
John A. Aylward, Democratic nominee for Governor in 1906
Adolph J. Schmitz, lawyer, Democratic nominee for Lieutenant Governor in 1894

Results

Republican primary

Candidates
James O. Davidson, incumbent Governor

Results

Socialist primary

Candidates
Harvey Dee Brown, preacher

Results

Prohibition primary

Candidates
Winfred Douglas Cox, Prohibition nominee for Wisconsin's 5th congressional district in 1900 and 1902

Results

General election

Candidates
Major party candidates
James O. Davidson, Republican
John A. Aylward, Democratic

Other candidates
Winfred Douglas Cox, Prohibition
Harvey Dee Brown, Socialist (Social-Democratic Party of Wisconsin)
Herman Bottema, Socialist Labor

Results

References

Bibliography
  
 
 

1908
Wisconsin
Gubernatorial
November 1908 events